Frank Cyril Quaife (5 April 1905 – 27 August 1968) was an English cricketer.  Quaife was a left-handed batsman who bowled slow left-arm orthodox.  He was born at Hastings, Sussex.

Quaife made two first-class appearances for Sussex against Yorkshire and Surrey in the 1928 County Championship.  He didn't score any runs in these two matches, while his only wicket was that of Yorkshire opening batsman Percy Holmes.  He later stood as an umpire in one first-class match between DR Jardine's XI and Oxford University in 1955.

He died at Eastbourne, Sussex on 27 August 1968.

References

External links
Frank Quaife at ESPNcricinfo
Frank Quaife at CricketArchive

1905 births
1968 deaths
Sportspeople from Hastings
English cricketers
Sussex cricketers
English cricket umpires